Sıraca is a village in the Kâhta District, Adıyaman Province, Turkey. The village is populated by Kurds of the Mirdêsî and had a population of 434 in 2021.

The hamlet of Baltalı is attached to Sıraca.

References

Villages in Kâhta District
Kurdish settlements in Adıyaman Province